Ersu Şaşma (born 30 September 1999) is a Turkish pole vaulter.

Ersu Şaşma was born on 30 September 1999 in Mersin, southern Turkey. He is a member of Fenerbahçe Athletics. He was coached by Halil İbrahim Çömlekçi who died in January 2021.

Şaşma improved his own record for juniors (U20) from 5.13 m to 5.20 m at the Olympic Trials Competition in Mersin in May 2018. He won the bronze medal at the 2018 Balkan Athletics Championships in Stara Zagora, Bulgaria.

At the First League of the 2019 European Athletics Team Championships in Sandnes, Norway, he took the bronze medal, and improved the national record in the Indoor U23 category about 1 cm to 5.41 m.

In 2020, Şaşma captured the gold medal at the Balkan Athletics Indoor Championships in Istanbul, Turkey.

He won his second gold medal at the Balkan Athletics Indoor Championships in Istanbul in 2021. He broke a new national record by jumping 5.80 m at the 3rd Orhan Altan Cup in Ankara by June 2021, and obtained so a quota for the 2020 Summer Olympics. In July, he won the bronze medal at the 2021 European Athletics U23 Championships with 5.60 m; the same mark as Sondre Guttormsen.

Competition record

References

1999 births
Living people
Sportspeople from Mersin
Turkish male pole vaulters
Fenerbahçe athletes
Athletes (track and field) at the 2020 Summer Olympics
Olympic athletes of Turkey
Olympic male pole vaulters
Mediterranean Games medalists in athletics
Athletes (track and field) at the 2022 Mediterranean Games
Mediterranean Games gold medalists for Turkey
21st-century Turkish people